Ryjan was a make of French automobile produced by the Grillet company between 1920 and 1926.   The factory was established in what was then a small town, a short distance to the west of Paris, called Chatou.  In 1925  production was relocated to Nanterre in the west of the country.

The business
The first Ryjan car was being promoted at the Paris Motor Show in October 1919, and almost immediately, in 1920, the newly formed business started to produce their first model.

The car
The 1920 “Ryjan HJ4” sat on a  wheelbase and was priced  by the manufacturer at 21,000 francs for a four-seater ”Torpedo” bodied car and 25,000 francs for a four-seater “conduite interieure” (closed sedan/saloon/berline) bodied car.   The engine was a 4-cylinder 2,292cc unit.   Other sources indicate that early cars used a 1690cc engine bought in from  S.C.A.P. (Société de Constructeur Automobiles Paris), a specialist engine manufacturer located nearby.

Five years later the manufacturer took at stand at the Auto Salon in October 1924.   This car still had a S.C.A.P. engine, now of 1,614cc: customers were able to choose between a sidevalve and an overhead valve version of this engine. The 1924/25 car sat on the same  wheelbase as before.    The manufacturer's listed price for a four-seater ”Torpedo” bodied car had increased to 27,000 francs, however, reflecting general inflation in the French economy.

For the last two years the cars were also advertised with a 2-litre engine from "Altos", another engine supplier.   Production ended in 1926.

References 

Defunct motor vehicle manufacturers of France
Vehicle manufacturing companies established in 1920
1926 disestablishments in France
1920s cars
Vehicle manufacturing companies disestablished in 1926
French companies established in 1920